Burnby is a village and former civil parish, now in the parish of Hayton, in the East Riding of Yorkshire, England. In 1931 the parish had a population of 103. On 1 April 1935 the parish was abolished and merged with Hayton.

The church dedicated to St Giles was designated a Grade II* listed building in 1967 and is now recorded in the National Heritage List for England, maintained by Historic England.

Burnby was served by Nunburnholme railway station on the York to Beverley Line between 1847 and 1951.

References

External links

Villages in the East Riding of Yorkshire
Former civil parishes in the East Riding of Yorkshire